Duke of la Victoria is a hereditary title in the Peerage of Spain, accompanied by the dignity of Grandee and granted in 1839 by Isabella II to Baldomero Espartero, who was Prime Minister of Spain, in remembrance of his military victories that led to the embrace of Vergara. He was also made Prince of Vergara by Amadeo I to recognise this peace treaty.

The current duke is the Ambassador of Spain in the Democratic Republic of the Congo.

Dukes of la Victoria (1839)

Joaquín Baldomero Fernández-Espartero y Álvarez de Toro, 1st Duke of la Victoria
Eladia Fernández-Espartero y Blanco, 2nd Duchess of la Victoria
Pablo Montesino y Fernández-Espartero, 3rd Duke of la Victoria
José Luis Montesino-Espartero y Averly, 4th Duke of la Victoria
Pablo Montesino-Espartero y Juliá, 5th Duke of la Victoria
Pablo Montesino-Espartero y Velasco, 6th Duke of la Victoria

See also
List of dukes in the peerage of Spain
List of current Grandees of Spain

References 

Dukedoms of Spain
Grandees of Spain
Lists of dukes
Lists of Spanish nobility